Richard Udell Chapin (July 3, 1929 – February 5, 2015) was an American lawyer and politician in the state of Washington. He served the 34th district from 1967 to 1970. An attorney, he was an alumnus of Columbia University and the University of Michigan College of Literature, Science, and the Arts.

References

2015 deaths
1929 births
Politicians from New York City
Columbia University alumni
University of Michigan College of Literature, Science, and the Arts alumni
Republican Party members of the Washington House of Representatives
Washington (state) lawyers
Lawyers from New York City
20th-century American lawyers